Amelia Mirel or Alma Bambú was the stage name of Amelia Ruggero, an early Argentine vedette, singer, and silent-film actress. After making approximately 20 movies, Mirel changed her stage name to Alma Bambú and began dancing in musical revues and burlesque theater.

Filmography
 Aves de rapiña (1921)
 Patagonia (1921)
 Jangada florida (1922)
 Allá en el sur (1922)
 Escándalo de medianoche (1923)
 La leyenda del puente inca (1923)
 Midinettes porteñas (1923)
 Fausto (1923)
 La casa de los cuervos (1923)
 Carne de presidio (1924)
 Criollo viejo (1924)
 El Viejo Morador de las Montañas (1924)
 Muñecos de cera (1925)
 El penado catorce'' (1930)

References

1900s births
1987 deaths
Argentine vedettes
Argentine stage actresses
Musicians from Buenos Aires
20th-century Argentine women singers